The European Parliament election of 2009 took place on 6–7 June 2009.

The People of Freedom (32.4%) was the largest party in Piedmont, ahead of the Democratic Party (24.7%) and Lega Nord (15.7%).

Results
Source: Ministry of the Interior

Elections in Piedmont
2009 elections in Italy
European Parliament elections in Italy
2009 European Parliament election